Komi Dje (Ԃ,ԃ italics: Ԃ ԃ) is a letter of the Molodtsov alphabet, a variant of Cyrillic. It was used only in the writing of the Komi language in the 1920s.

The letter was derived from Ԁ, d with the addition of a hook.

Computing codes

See also 
Cyrillic characters in Unicode

Languages of Russia
Permic languages
Cyrillic letters